Spats or SPATS may refer to:
 Spats (footwear), a type of shoe accessory
 Spats (radio series), a comedy sketch show on BBC 7
 Spats Baxter, a character in Movie Movie (1978), played by George C. Scott
 "Spats" Columbo, lead gangster in the film Some Like It Hot (1959)
 The Spats, a 1970s band in New Zealand
 The Spats (American band), a 1960s band in California, U.S.
 Fender skirts, automobile wheel covers, known as spats in Australia and the UK
 An aircraft fairing covering the wheels
 Compression shorts, known as spats in Japan
 South Pacific Association of Theological Schools

See also
 Carl Andrew Spaatz, US Air Force general
 Spaatz Island, a large ice-covered island of Antarctica
 Spat (disambiguation)
 Spatz